Mic Looby (born 1969) is an Australian author and illustrator.

A former guidebook writer for Lonely Planet, his debut novel Paradise Updated – a satire about the inner workings of a guidebook company – was published in 2009 by Affirm Press. Looby is also a columnist with the Australian chapter of The Big Issue magazine and has illustrated three titles in the It's True! series of children's non-fiction books published by Allen & Unwin.

Bibliography

Further reading
 Article from The Australian by Mic Looby, on baldness and travel (2009)
 Article from The Age by Mic Looby, on children's music (2009)
 Article from The Age by Mic Looby, on memories of summer (2009)

External links
 Black Snake at Affirm Press
 Paradise Updated at Affirm Press
 Mic Looby Bio – It's True Books
 Looking for Looby: a profile
 Case for boycotting Burma is too simplistic

1969 births
Living people
21st-century Australian novelists
Australian cartoonists
Australian columnists
Australian male novelists
Writers from Victoria (Australia)
21st-century Australian male writers